
Gmina Tarnowiec is a rural gmina (administrative district) in Jasło County, Subcarpathian Voivodeship, in south-eastern Poland.

Villages
Gmina Tarnowiec contains the villages and settlements of Brzezówka, Czeluśnica, Dobrucowa, Gąsówka, Gliniczek, Glinik Polski, Łajsce, Łubienko, Łubno Opace, Łubno Szlacheckie, Nowy Glinik, Potakówka, Roztoki, Sądkowa, Tarnowiec, Umieszcz and Wrocanka.

Neighbouring gminas
Gmina Tarnowiec is bordered by the town of Jasło and by the gminas of Chorkówka, Dębowiec, Jasło, Jedlicze and Nowy Żmigród.

References
 Polish official population figures 2006

Tarnowiec
Jasło County